Joseph Reese Strayer (1904–1987) was an American medievalist historian. He was a student of and mentored by Charles Homer Haskins, America's first prominent medievalist historian.

Life
Strayer graduated from Princeton University (BA) and Harvard University (PhD).  Strayer taught at Princeton University for many decades, starting in the 1930s. He was chair of the history department (1941–1961) and president of the American Historical Association in 1971. Strayer has been credited with training a large percentage of the American medievalist profession wity liberal fashion; many of his students are still teaching and active. Notable students include Teofilo Ruiz, William Chester Jordan, and Richard W. Kaeuper. Norman F. Cantor often highlighted his status as a student of Strayer's; in spite of anonymous denials by several of Strayer's other pupils of any academic relationship between Cantor and Strayer whatsoever, Cantor names Strayer as his doctoral supervisor in the preface of "Church, Kingship, and Lay Investiture in England".

When not teaching medieval history at Princeton, Strayer was involved with the CIA, as a member of the CIA's Office of National Estimates. The extent of his involvement, at a time when the CIA was running covert operations to destabilize governments around the world (Iran, Brazil, Congo, Dominican Republic, Guyana and Chile), has never been fully assessed or verified.

Norman Cantor recognized three books as most important to Strayer's legacy: Feudalism (1965), which summarized three decades of his research and thinking on the topic; On the Medieval Origins of the Modern State (1970), in which he shows the relevance of medieval historical institutions to modern governmental institutions; and The Reign of Philip the Fair (1980), representing over 30 years of archival research and the most comprehensive work on the topic in any language – other than Jean Favier's Philippe le Bel (1978). Strayer was editor of the Dictionary of the Middle Ages, the largest and most comprehensive encyclopedia on the subject in the English language.

Strayer was an elected member of both the American Academy of Arts and Sciences and the American Philosophical Society.

Bibliography
Administration of Normandy Under Saint Louis (1932)
The Middle Ages, 395–1500 (1942)  – an extended textbook survey. Originally co-authored by Dana C. Munro in 1942, by the 1959 4th edition it was mostly all Strayer. Cantor says it is important for "its brilliant summary of European political history from about 1050 to 1350".
Western Europe in the Middle Ages: a Short History (1955) – a brief version of the above, reprinted in later editions.
The Interpretation of History (1950)
The Course of Civilization (1961)
Feudalism (1965)
On the Medieval Origins of the Modern State (1970)
Medieval statecraft and the perspectives of history (1971)
The Albigensian Crusade (1972)
The Royal Domain in the Bailliage of Rouen (1976)
The Reign of Philip the Fair (1980)
Dictionary of the Middle Ages, editor (1982 to 1989)

Notes

References
Cantor, Norman (1991). Inventing the Middle Ages. 
Cavanagh, John, Dulles Papers Reveal CIA Consulting Network, Forerunner, April 29, 1980, 
Homem, A. L. C.;Freitas,  J. G. (1991).  «On a Medievalist’s Death»: Joseph R. Strayer (1904–1987), Revista da Faculdade de Letras [Porto University]. História, II sér., VIII (1991): 439–445.

1904 births
1987 deaths
American medievalists
Historians of the Crusades
20th-century American historians
American male non-fiction writers
Fellows of the British Academy
Fellows of the Medieval Academy of America
20th-century American male writers
Princeton University alumni
Members of the American Philosophical Society
Harvard University alumni